Lea County Jal Airport  is a county-owned public-use airport located three nautical miles (6 km) northeast of the central business district of Jal, a city in Lea County, New Mexico, United States.

This airport is included in the FAA's National Plan of Integrated Airport Systems (2009-2013), which categorizes it as a general aviation airport.

Facilities and aircraft 
It has two asphalt paved runways: 1/19 is 4,704 by 60 feet (1,434 x 18 m) and 9/27 is 2,604 by 50 feet (794 x 15 m).

For the 12-month period ending April 7, 2008, the airport had 4,200 aircraft operations, an average of 11 per day.

References

External links 
 
 

Airports in New Mexico
Transportation in Lea County, New Mexico
Buildings and structures in Lea County, New Mexico